Sulfanilic acid (4-aminobenzenesulfonic acid) is an organic compound with the formula H3NC6H4SO3. It is an off-white solid. It is a zwitterion, which explains its high melting point.  It is a common building block in organic chemistry.

Synthesis
Sulfanilic acid can be produced the sulfonation of aniline with concentrated sulfuric acid. This proceeds via phenylsulfamic acid; a zwitterion with a N-S bond. Eugen Bamberger originally proposed a mechanism involving a series of intramolecular rearrangements, with phenylsulfamic acid forming orthanilic acid, which rearranged to sulfanilic acid on heating. Subsequent radiosulphur studies showed that the process is intermolecular, with the phenylsulfamic acid desulfating to generate sulfur trioxide, which then reacts with aniline at the para position in manner similar to a Bamberger rearrangement.

Applications

As the compound readily forms diazo compounds, it is used to make dyes and sulfa drugs. This property is also used for the quantitative analysis of nitrate and nitrite ions by diazonium coupling reaction with N-(1-Naphthyl)ethylenediamine, resulting in an azo dye, and the concentration of nitrate or nitrite ions were deduced from the color intensity of the resulting red solution by colorimetry.

It is also used as a standard in combustion analysis and in the Pauly reaction.

Environmental aspects
Reflecting its wide use, sulfanilic acid is found in the leachates of landfills. It is produced by reduction of some azo dyes.

Derivatives 
 Methyl orange (azo coupling with dimethylaniline)
 Acid orange 7 (azo coupling with 2-naphthol)
 Chrysoine resorcinol (azo coupling with resorcinol)

See also 
 Orthanilic acid
 Metanilic acid
 Sulfanilamide

References

Benzenesulfonic acids
Anilines